Mir Adina is a village in the Malistan District of Ghazni Province of Afghanistan. In 2003, the estimated population was 1000 families.

See also 
 Ghazni Province

References 

Populated places in Ghazni Province
Villages in Afghanistan